Grand Chain is a village in Pulaski County, Illinois, United States. The population was 190 at the 2010 census.  The village's official name changed from "Grand Chain" to "New Grand Chain" in the 1970s, but its residents continue to refer to it as "Grand Chain."

Geography
Grand Chain is located at  (37.253578, -89.020361).

Demographics

As of the census of 2000, there were 233 people, 99 households, and 63 families residing in the village. The racial makeup of the village was 90.99% White and 9.01% African American.

There were 99 households, out of which 31.3% had children under the age of 18 living with them, 48.5% were married couples living together, 13.1% had a female householder with no husband present, and 35.4% were non-families. 34.3% of all households were made up of individuals, and 15.2% had someone living alone who was 65 years of age or older. The average household size was 2.35 and the average family size was 3.03.

In the village, the population was spread out, with 25.8% under the age of 18, 8.2% from 18 to 24, 26.6% from 25 to 44, 21.0% from 45 to 64, and 18.5% who were 65 years of age or older. The median age was 38 years. For every 100 females, there were 94.2 males. For every 100 females age 18 and over, there were 94.4 males.

The median income for a household in the village was $29,688, and the median income for a family was $36,500. Males had a median income of $38,750 versus $14,375 for females. The per capita income for the village was $14,617. About 21.7% of families and 21.5% of the population were below the poverty line, including 32.4% of those under the age of eighteen and 15.0% of those 65 or over.

Notable people
George W. Bristow, Chief Justice of the Illinois Supreme Court, was born in Grand Chain.
Laura Jacinta Rittenhouse (1841–1911), temperance worker, author, poet, orphanage manager, clubwoman

References

Villages in Pulaski County, Illinois
Villages in Illinois